Yeung Kwo (1914 – 25 August 1956) was a member of the Malayan Communist Party. A Malayan of Chinese descent, he was appointed to the Central Executive Committee of the Malayan Communist Party (MCP) in 1946. He was an opponent of Lai Teck, the party's secretary general until 1947.

References

Malaysian independence activists
Malaysian communists
1914 births
1956 deaths